The Sat Gambuj Mosque is near the northwestern outskirts of Dhaka in the Mohammadpur area. It is a fine example of the provincial Mughal style of architecture introduced in Bangladesh in the 17th century. The mosque's most notable features are its seven bulbous domes crowning the roof and covering the main prayer hall. Probably erected by Governor Shaista Khan, the monument stands in a romantic setting on a buttressed 15-foot-high bank overlooking an extensive flood plain.

History

A few kilometers to the north of Peelkhana, for long the end of Mughal Dhaka, was the Jafarbad or Katasur area, originally part of mouza Sarai Begumpur. Many of the mouzas (or revenue circles) were delineated during the reign of Shershah and later by Kartalab Khan. A small urban settlement on a route along the river, this was an alternative to reach Brahmaputra or Garh Jaripa without having to go through the hostile areas along the main stream of Sitalakhya and Brahmaputra on the east. This is evident from its geographic and strategic location, origin of the names of the locality, and the remnants around it.

The place where the seven-domed mosque is was known as Sarai Jafarbad or Katasur, under Sarai Begumpur. There was a small agricultural community in between Pilkhana and Jafarbad where the Sat Gambuj Mosque was built. The area became like a jungle due to disuse, dereliction, and desertion. However, in last 55 years, it has become one of the most planned and most expensive residential enclaves of Dhaka. The Sat Masjid Road is the major peripheral road of the district to its west and is believed to have been built roughly along where the old Bank river Turag was.

Structure
Picturesquely situated on the edge of a river, the Shat Cumbuj Mosque's exterior is the most innovative of all the Dhaka Mughal-period monuments. The north and south ends of this three-domed rectangular mosque are each marked by two enormous double-storied corner pavilions; when viewed from the east these give the impression that the mosque has five exterior bays. On the east are three cusped entrances arches flanked by shallow niches. Slender engaged columns with bulbous bases demarcate the central bay (as seen as the Lalbagh Fort Mosque, although this mosque's colonettes are more prominent).

Its interior compares favourably with that of others dating to the second half of the 16th century. The central mihrab has two rows of cusping, and its surface is embellished with moulded plaster relief, recalling the ornateness of the mihrab in the mosque of Haji Khwaja Shahbaz.

It used forms shapes—octagon, rectangle and circle—all beautifully juxtaposed. Besides the typical three domes on the main prayer hall, there are four hollow double-storey domed corner towers that gave rise to its name (Seven-Domed Mosque). The corner turret provided structural stability and visual balance to the 38'×27' building on a river bank and was probably used as viewing galleries for enjoying the river. The upper level of the octagonal turrets starts from around half the height of the main prayer hall. Both levels have arched panels and windows, surmounted by cornice and capped by domes with kalasha (pitcher) finials planted on lotus base.

Otherwise with a bigger dome in the middle flanked by two smaller pennis, the mosque bears all the characteristic features of Shaista Khani style. However, though the qibla facades of most such buildings remain unadorned, that of the Sat Gambuj Mosque is decorated with recessions within moulded panels, the middle portion delineated by two slender pilasters slightly protruding. These are much bigger than those usually seen at the front. The three central panels have an arch-shape on the lower part.

The mosque has three cusped entrance arches, the middle one being taller and edged with multi-foil arch, a late-Mughal refinement, flanked by shallow niches and rectangular panels and echoed by mihrabs on the qibla wall, slender engaged pilasters with bulbous base demarcating the central bay, mihrab surface embellished with moulded plaster relief, corner turret stretched above merlon parapet with pinnacles, mingle, openings on side walls, etc.

The side entrances have mere decoration applied to their external faces some of which may not be original. All these elements emphasize the symmetrical and axial arrangement along with the central dome and the mihrab. The style is very common among most of the surviving historic mosques of Dhaka. Built on a spacious and solid podium, it has many elements resembling those in Khwaja Shahbaz Mosque, Khan Muhammad Mirdha's Mosque, and the mosque inside the Lalbagh Fort.

The heights of the entrances and other openings have been distorted or dwarfed by elevation of the plint level as the ground around was constantly elevated to remain above flood level. However, the two slender pinnacles rising on both sides of the panel provide a kind of vertically to this otherwise horizontal and stout structure. This element achieved a level of perfection and hence elegance in the Mridha's Mosque built quarter of a century later. There are eight small panels on each side of the door, all of which are enclose arched niches. The transition from the square to the circle of the dome base is made by pendentives. However, the domes are conventional, rest on octagonal drum shoulder, embellished with blind merlons. The brick lime walls of the naturally cool structures are 6 feet deep.

There is a graveyard in front of the mosque used as late as the 1950s. It was originally inside a wider garden that was gradually eroded by river and encroached by buildings. A distinct gateway in front of the sahn that was now subsided because of gradual rise in the surrounding levels can be climbed over for azan (prayer call). The river Turag on which the picturesque structure was standing even few decades back, has now moved nearly a kilometer away from it due to silt, encroachment by filling up, and change of course.

The surrounding reclaimed lands for many years were used by small scale manufacturers, semi-permanent houses and slums. But now heavier and more intensive uses can be seen.

Present condition

The Nawab of Dhaka Khwaja Ahsanullah had the abandoned structure re-embellished as it was later listed in 1913 by the ASI. Due to its uninterrupted use and some care and maintenance since then, the mosque did not require any renovation. However, in the past, the DOA made several unacceptable modifications while carrying out periodic repairs that show the poverty of its mind. For example, the use of terrazzo on the floor of the main prayer hall and the courtyard is contrary to normal conservation practices that would have avoided using most modern materials to maintain an authenticity. Some recent renovation jobs, for example applying the thick white plaster, have also drawn criticism from experts.

Like in and around many other heritage structures all over the country, the premises of Sat Gambuj Mosque is occupied by religious groups building illegal structures and extensions to the listed building, ignoring its heritage value, building codes and rules, fiercely protecting their possessions.

Few travelers see Sat Gambuj Mosque because of its somewhat remote location.

See also
 List of mosques in Bangladesh
 List of archaeological sites in Bangladesh

References

External links

17th-century mosques
Mosques in Dhaka